Fudbalski klub Vlasenica is a football club from Vlasenica, Republika Srpska, Bosnia and Herzegovina. The club competed in the First League of the Republika Srpska. However, due to poor results FK Vlasenica was relegated to the Second League of the Republika Srpska, a third-tier competition in Bosnia and Herzegovina.

The club was founded in 1945.

References

Football clubs in Bosnia and Herzegovina
Football clubs in Republika Srpska
Association football clubs established in 1945
1945 establishments in Bosnia and Herzegovina